East Bengal Club (ইস্ট বেঙ্গল ক্লাব), commonly referred to as East Bengal, is an Indian professional multi-sports club based in Kolkata, West Bengal. It is best known for its professional men's football team that competes in the Indian Super League, the top flight of the Indian football. It is one of the most successful football clubs in the country.

Founded in August 1920, the club became affiliated with the Indian Football Association in 1922 and initially played in the Calcutta Football League Second Division before earning promotion to the First Division in 1924. East Bengal won its first First Division league title in 1942 and has since won it a record 39 times. The club was a founding member of the National Football League, the first nation-wide football league in India in 1996, which it has won three times since. They have also won eight Federation Cups, three Super Cups, a record 29 IFA Shield titles, and a record 16 Durand Cup titles, making the club one of the most decorated in Indian football.

East Bengal is one of the most widely supported football clubs in Asia. The club is mainly supported by the Bangals, i.e., the immigrant population from the eastern region of Bengal, who were forced to leave their homes (modern-day Bangladesh) during the partition of 1947. For those people, East Bengal Club became a source of identity and hope. The huge influx of dispossessed into the state led to a socio-economic crisis. This led to rivalries among the immigrant and native population of West Bengal, popularly named as Bangal (বাঙাল) in every sphere of life, from jobs to schools and even on football pitches. As a result, East Bengal has a long-standing rivalry with its cross-town competitors Mohun Bagan, now known as ATK Mohun Bagan, which is mainly supported by the native population, named popularly as Ghoti (ঘটি), with whom it competes in the Kolkata derby, Asia's biggest football rivalry. East Bengal also shares a local rivalry with another Kolkata club, Mohammedan. The club dons the iconic red and golden yellow colours, which give it the nickname of Red and Gold Brigade and Laal Holud (লাল হলুদ). The both teams have separate nicknames for their adversaries, i.e. Macha (মাচা) for the Mohun Bagan fans and Lota (লোটা) for the East Bengal fans. In 2011, East Bengal was ranked second amongst all India teams and 554th internationally by the International Federation of Football History & Statistics in the international rankings of clubs for the first decade of the 21st century (2001-2010).

The club has other departments too such as the women's football, cricket, women's cricket, field hockey, athletics and eSports teams.

History

Formation
On 28 July 1920, Jorabagan Club was scheduled to play against Mohun Bagan in the Coochbehar Cup. Jorabagan Club sent out their starting eleven but with the notable exclusion of defender Sailesh Bose, who was dropped from the squad for undisclosed reasons. The then vice-president of Jorabagan Club, Suresh Chandra Chaudhuri, asked in vain for Bose to be included in the line-up. When his request was not welcomed, Chaudhuri left the club along with Raja Manmatha Nath Chaudhuri, Ramesh Chandra Sen, and Aurobinda Ghosh. They formed East Bengal Club as a Sports and Cultural Association in the neighbourhood of Jorabagan on 1 August 1920. The name East Bengal was chosen for the newly formed club as the founders hailed from the eastern region of Bengal. Sarada Ranjan Ray took on the role of becoming the first president of this newly formed club while Suresh Chandra Chowdhury and Tarit Bhusan Roy were declared to be the first joint secretaries of the club. Soon after, Nagen Kali, M. Talukdar, B. Sen, N. Gossain, Goshto Paul (on loan from Mohun Bagan), P. Bardhan, S. Das, S. Tagore, J. Mukherjee, Ramesh Chandra Sen, S. Bose, C. Bose, A. Roy, and A. Bannerjee were announced to be the members of the first team squad by the board.

Early years: 1920 – 1930s

In the same month of its formation, the club participated in its maiden tournament in, the Hercules Cup, a seven-a-side tournament. On 11 August 1920, the club played their first match in the tournament and in their history against Metropolitan College, which they went on to win 4–0. East Bengal went on to win the tournament, announcing the arrival of a club that would break many records in the future. The club also won Khagendra Shield in 1921. Following this, the club became affiliated with the Indian Football Association (IFA) and entered league play in the IFA Second Division. The club finished placing third in their maiden season in the league. The first match between East Bengal and Mohun Bagan took place on 8 August 1921 in the Cooch Behar Cup semi-final match, which didn't turn in the favour of either of the teams as it ended in a goalless draw. It was an unofficial derby at that time.

In 1924, the club won the Second Division and gained promotion to the IFA First Division after finishing in second place to Cameroons 'B'. As Cameroons 'A' team was already in the First Division the 'B' team could not gain promotion to the same league. East Bengal was next in line for promotion. However, more controversy arose since the IFA allowed only two Indian-based clubs in the IFA First Division at a time (at that time, the IFA was a British organization). This rule had previously deprived clubs like "Kumartuli" and "Town" from entering the First Division. During a governing body meeting of the IFA, the nine British clubs approved East Bengal's promotion to the First Division. Ironically, the two Indian clubs, Mohun Bagan and Aryan, opposed it. East Bengal's efforts led to the abolition of the oppressive Indian club limit rule.

In 1925, East Bengal made its IFA First Division debut, and Mona Dutta became the maiden goalscorer for the club in the league. On 28 May 1925, the first official Kolkata Derby was played, where Nepal Chakraborty scored the only goal for East Bengal.

1940s – 1970s

It took the club till 1942 to win their first IFA First Division title. East Bengal won their first IFA Shield in 1943. They then achieved the double in 1945 by winning both the Calcutta Football League (CFL) and IFA Shield. In 1948, East Bengal became the first team to defeat a foreign club on home soil. They won 2–0 against the visiting Chinese Olympic XI. East Bengal won their first treble in the 1949 season, by winning the Calcutta League, the IFA Shield and the Rovers Cup, becoming the first Indian club to do so. The club went on to win the 1949 Rovers Cup and the Durand Cup in 1951. That period saw the rise of the Pancha Pandavas. The five players, P. B. A. Saleh, Ahmed Khan, P. Venkatesh, Appa Rao, and K. P. Dhanaraj played together at the club from 1949 to 1953. The club also won its first DCM Trophy in 1950. The club also won three straight IFA Shields in 1949, 1950, and 1951. The English Football Association 1951–52 annual almanac adjudged East Bengal as the best club in Asia. On being recommended by the president of India, Rajendra Prasad, the club was invited by the Romania Youth Festival Committee in 1953 to participate in a football tournament. They also partook in a tour of the Soviet Union the same year. They were defeated by Soviet side by a margin of 13–1. Apart from football, East Bengal also won the Beighton Cup hockey tournament for the first time in 1957 and the Bengal Hockey Association league in 1960. Again the club won the Rovers Cup several times during this era—1962, 1967, 1969, 1972, 1973, 1975—as well as the Durand Cup in 1952, 1956, 1960, 1967, 1970, 1972 and 1978. The club also won its first Sait Nagjee football tournament and Bordoloi Trophy in 1968. The club stunned everyone by winning the 1970 IFA Shield against PAS Club of Iran by a score of 1–0, in front of 60,000 supporters at the Eden Gardens. Later, the club won the 1973 IFA Shield by defeating Pyongyang City SC of North Korea. In 1978, East Bengal won its first Federation Cup title. The club became joint winners in cricket with Mohun Bagan of Cricket Association of Bengal senior league and senior-division knockout tournament.

East Bengal won the Calcutta Football League for six straight years from 1970 to 1975. In 1970, East Bengal topped the Calcutta Football League table without conceding a single goal. East Bengal won multiple times against their arch-rivals, Mohun Bagan, including a record margin of 5–0 in the history of the Kolkata Derby, in 1975. The same year, East Bengal won the CFL title without losing a match. The 1970s decade of the club is also commonly known as "Shonali Doshok" (in English Golden era).

1980s – 1990s
The club won the Federation Cup in 1980 and again in 1985. They also became the first Indian club to play in the newly reorganized Asian Club Championship in 1985–86. The club then won their second treble in 1990, under coach Naeemuddin, by winning the IFA Shield, the Rovers Cup, and the Durand Cup in the same season. The club also won the Stafford Cup (1986) and the McDowell's Cup (1995, 1997). In 1993, East Bengal won its first-ever international title, the Wai Wai Cup in Nepal. The club also won the Federation Cup, the IFA Shield, the Calcutta Football League, the Durand Cup, and the Rovers Cup several times during this period. In 1996, the club became the founding member of the first nationwide football league in India, the National Football League.

In 1984, Dipak Das joined the club and revamped it. He brought professionalism and converted the football team into a private, limited company. He also secured sponsorship from local brands and companies like Khadims. In 1998, he collaborated with Vijay Mallya's United Breweries Group, which then formed a new Private Limited Company, with a 50–50 shareholding, called United East Bengal Football Team Private Limited and incorporated the football team—the first in the country. The team was renamed Kingfisher East Bengal FC.

2000s – 2010s

The club entered the 21st century in style, winning the 2000–01 National Football League season. They became the first club to win back-to-back titles after winning the 2002–03 and 2003–04 versions of the league. The club went on to win the Federation Cup again in 2007, 2009, 2010 and 2012. They also won the Indian Super Cup in 2006 and 2011. The club won their third international trophy in the 2003 ASEAN Club Championship, in Jakarta, Indonesia. East Bengal is still the only Indian football team to win any major trophy outside the country. In 2004, East Bengal also won the San Miguel International Cup in Nepal. The club was invited to the tournament by Leicester City, celebrating their 120th Anniversary. In 2004, Leicester City also had partnerships with East Bengal. Then FIFA president, Joseph Blatter, visited the club tent on 15 April 2007. After a year, East Bengal became the first Indian football team to win against a West Asian team, Al Wihdat SC of Jordan on foreign soil.East Bengal also made a record eight appearances, between 2004 and 2015, in the AFC Cup. The club played in the semi-finals of 2013 AFC Cup where they lost to Kuwait SC of Kuwait. The club has the achievement of winning the Calcutta Football League title eight consecutive times from 2010 to 2017, breaking their previous record of six times during the 1970s. Following the exit of Kingfisher from the club, Quess Corp signed an agreement with the East Bengal Club and acquired a 70 percent stake in the club in July 2018. The football team was rebranded as Quess East Bengal FC.

On 1 August 2019, the club entered its 100th establishment year. A centenary celebration logo was introduced. Torch rallies and events were organised, and attended by former players, coaches, presidents, etc. The centenary kit was unveiled, which was inspired by the 1925–26 season kit. The club participated in the Durand Cup, the Calcutta Football League and the I-League, and played its first match and won against Army Red in the Durand Cup.

2020 – present 

The year 2020, saw the wake of COVID-19 which halted the ongoing football season in the country. The then investor, Quess pulled out from the two-year-old agreement by July 2020. On 1 August, the club completed its 100 years of existence. In September, Shree Cement was announced as the new investor of the club. The company acquired 76 percent shares of the club and renamed it from "East Bengal Football Club" to "Sporting Club East Bengal". Later that month, after successful bidding, the club moved from the I-League to the Indian Super League. In early 2022, the club parted ways with its investor Shree Cement.

The partnership between investor group Shree Cement and East Bengal Club was terminated after the end of the 2021–22 Indian Super League season. They returned the sporting rights to the club on 12 April 2022, after both the parties failed to reach an agreement and the final term sheet was not accepted and signed by the club officials. The club officials, however, stated that East Bengal club shall continue to play in the Indian Super League, and shall be announcing their new investors within the next two weeks. East Bengal club was once again handed another transfer ban by AIFF for non-payment of dues for seven of their players.

On 25 May, East Bengal announced the collaboration with Emami as the principal investors of the club. The club confirmed their participation in the 2022-23 Indian Super League season with the arrival of the new investors. On 18 July, after two months of contractual discussions between the club and the investor group, the club finally started the recruitment process for the new season after receiving a go-ahead from the investors. On 22 July, the AIFF uplifted the transfer ban set on East Bengal and thus allowed the club to register their new signings for the season. East Bengal appointed Santosh Trophy winning Kerala football team head-coach Bino George as the care-taker head coach of the team for the Calcutta Football League and Durand Cup, and will become the assistant coach of the team for the Indian Super League. East Bengal also roped in former India national football team coach Stephen Constantine as the new head-coach of the team for the season. The club also announced that the formal tie-up between them and the new investor group Emami.

Crest and colours

Crest
In 1930, Mahatma Gandhi's Satyagraha swept over India and affected football. Indian clubs boycotted the ongoing Calcutta Football League midway through the season. Amidst much confusion, Royal Regiment was declared the winner in the first division. However, East Bengal was not allowed to be promoted to the First Division. Thousands of East Bengal fans and officials decided to hold a protest march at the East Bengal Ground. It was at this march that flaming torches were carried by the protesters. And the hand holding flame torch (known as 'Mawshal' or 'মশাল' in Bangla) became the club emblem, which has remained to this day.

Colours
The primary and secondary colors of East Bengal are red and yellow respectively. Traditionally, the home kit consists of a red and yellow jersey with black shorts, while the away kit colors vary every year. These colors came about after the club was formed when the founders debated over them for the club jersey. At that time, the jerseys used to come from England. The founders, while searching, came across the red and gold color shirt hanging at the Whiteaway, Laidlaw & Co. department store in Chowringhee, Kolkata. It attracted them, and they finalized the colors and jersey. It cost ₹80 in 1920, four times higher than the average. These colours permanently integrated with the club.

Kit manufacturers and shirt sponsors

Supporters

East Bengal is a club mainly supported by the migrant population, known as Bangal, from the former Indian part of East Bengal (now modern-day Bangladesh). East Bengal is one of Asia's biggest and most supported football clubs. There are approximately 30 to 40 million supporters from all across the nation and overseas. In October 2020, the club got voted as the most popular football club in India on an AFC poll by its supporters, gaining approximately 49% of the votes.

East Bengal Ultras, the main ultras (supporters) group of East Bengal, was established in 2013. It was the first ultras group to be established in the country. Since its inception, this group has set many new records and broken older ones. Though initially, people were skeptical about the group, now they have seen in what ways this group is benefitting Indian football. Though all these achievements came along with some controversies. As in the past, there have been fights and hooliganism among the fans of the rival clubs, the administration does not completely trust the group's functioning.

Established on 15 November 2006, East Bengal the Real Power is India's first registered fan club. It is East Bengal's largest fan club and one of the largest in the country. In its early years, its functioning was limited to online platforms, but later on, it became a supporters' group.

Rivalries
East Bengal have rivalries with ATK Mohun Bagan, Mohammedan,  Bengaluru and Odisha.
East Bengal have their biggest rivalry with its city competitors ATK Mohun Bagan. East Bengal, as mentioned earlier, is primarily supported by the migrant population of present-day Bangladesh. Unlike East Bengal, ATK Mohun Bagan is a club mainly supported by the native population of the present-day state of West Bengal. The match that takes place between these two clubs is eminently called the Kolkata Derby. The Kolkata Derby has its name taken from the Old Firm Derby between Celtic and Rangers and dates back to the 1920s. After Indian independence and the partition of Bengal, the huge influx of immigrants from the eastern part of Bengal led to a socio-economic crisis in the state. This led to rivalries in jobs, business, schools, and even on the football pitch among the immigrants and native population. This rivalry became fierce, and the Kolkata Derby grew in popularity and reached its peak during the 1960s and 1970s. The Kolkata Derby holds a record of  spectators, the most attended sporting event in India.

Ownership
East Bengal is mainly organized as a registered society under the Societies Registration Act, 1860, which means one can avail of membership in the club. There are around 12,000 members. Although, a limited company, named East Bengal Club Pvt. Ltd., was later formed, and both are governed by the club parallelly. Sponsorships and investments happen via this corporate company. The club is governed by its own set of rules and regulations. Amendments and resolutions are passed via extraordinary or annual general meeting.

Currently the football rights are with a new limited company, Emami East Bengal FC Pvt. Ltd. jointly owned by East Bengal Club and Emami Group.

Stadiums
The club has used several stadiums at Kolkata, Howrah and Barasat, including the Eden Gardens, which has been reserved for cricket since Salt Lake Stadium opened in 1984. The first ground used by the club was Kumartuli Park in north Kolkata.

Salt Lake Stadium

The Salt Lake Stadium, also known as Vivekananda Yuba Bharati Krirangan (VYBK), is a multi-purpose stadium in Kolkata, built in 1984. The stadium is the largest non-auto racing in India. It is currently used mainly for football matches. The stadium includes a unique running track, long jump track, electronic scoreboard, natural turf, floodlighting arrangement, air-conditioned VIP restroom and Conference Hall, Medical Room, and a Doping Control Room. The Salt Lake Stadium hosts the home games of East Bengal in the Indian Super League and the AFC Cup. The total capacity of the stadium is 85,000.

East Bengal Ground

The East Bengal Ground is located in Kolkata and is the club's home. The stadium lies in the Maidan (Kolkata) area on the northern side of Fort William and near the Eden Gardens. This stadium is used mostly for Calcutta Football League matches and by the academy, women's, and hockey teams. The total capacity of the stadium is 23,500.

Other grounds
Barasat Stadium is also used by the club for some regional matches, especially in cases where the Salt Lake Stadium or East Bengal Ground cannot be used. Kanchenjunga Stadium, a multipurpose stadium based in Siliguri, has also been used several times to host club football matches. It also hosted the 2012 Federation Cup. Kalyani Stadium, situated on the outskirts of Kolkata at Kalyani, was used by East Bengal as their home turf during the 2019–20 I-League.

The team also trains at one of the VYBK practice grounds.

Players

Current squad

Promoted from Reserves squad

Personnel

Current technical staff

Corporate team
As of September 2022

Management

 
East Bengal Club

Board of Directors for Emami East Bengal FC Pvt. Ltd.

Records

Record in Indian Super League

Record in NFL / I-League

Performance in AFC competitions

Honours

Major trophies of East Bengal include the following:

 
  Shared record

Awards
Banga Bibhushan: 2022

Other departments

Reserves team and Academy

East Bengal Club Reserves is the reserve team of East Bengal Club. It is the most senior level beneath the first team. The team generally consists of younger players but at times senior players also play, if recuperating from injury or not getting first team game time. Reserve side currently plays in Calcutta Football League.

East Bengal Academy are the club's under-21, under-18, under-15 and under-13 sections. The under-21 team is generally referred to as the primary youth team as it is the last stage of progression for promotion of youth players into the reserve or first team. The youth teams participate in the Reliance Foundation Development League and the Youth League of various age groups.

Women's football
The women's football team was formed in 2001 but was disbanded in 2003. It won the Calcutta Women's Football League title in its inaugural season and was runners-up in 2002. In the centenary year, the women's team was relaunched. In the first year of relaunch, the East Bengal women's team became runner's up of the 2020 Kanyashree Cup.

Cricket

The East Bengal Club Cricket team participates in various tournaments for varying age groups conducted by the Cricket Association of Bengal. Currently, it participates in the CAB First Division League, CAB Senior Knockout, CAB Super League, and JC Mukherjee Trophy. The team plays its home matches mostly at the Eden Gardens and Jadavpur University Campus Ground. They have won around 60 major state-level trophies so far. Kapil Dev, Sachin Tendulkar, Ajay Jadeja, Navjot Singh Sidhu and Sourav Ganguly have played on the team.

Hockey

This department started after the Independence of India. The club is affiliated with the Bengal Hockey Association and participated in the BHA First Division hockey league and the Beighton Cup. They won 13 trophies. The team was disbanded in 2000. The hockey department was restarted in 2021 with Calcutta Hockey League.

Athletics
East Bengal has an athletics team, which is affiliated with the West Bengal Athletic Association, and participates in various tournaments of West Bengal. The club also organizes Annual Athletic meets at the club ground.

E-Sports
East Bengal also took part in the inaugural season of e-ISL where the ISL teams competed to play the video game FIFA 22. The club was represented by 2 youngsters, Ankit Gupta and Shayantan Mondal.

Affiliated clubs

The following club was formerly affiliated with East Bengal:
  Leicester City (2002–2003)
The following club is currently affiliated with East Bengal:
  Sheikh Russel KC (2022–present)

See also
 East Bengal Club in international football
 East Bengal Club league record by opponent
 List of East Bengal Club wins against Foreign teams
 List of foreign players for East Bengal Club
 List of East Bengal Club records and statistics
 Indian football clubs in Asian competitions

Notes

References

Further reading

Chatterjee, Partha. The Nation and Its Fragments: Colonial and Post-colonial Histories (Calcutta: Oxford University Press, 1995).

Goswami, Ramesh Chandra (1963). East Bengal Cluber Itihas . Kolkata: Book Garden.
Bandyopadhyay, Santipriya (1979). Cluber Naam East Bengal . Kolkata: New Bengal Press.
Chattopadhyay, Hariprasad (2017). Mohun Bagan–East Bengal . Kolkata: Parul Prakashan.

External links

  Official website 
Club profile in ISL website

East Bengal Club
Association football clubs established in 1920
I-League clubs
1920 establishments in India
Sport in West Bengal
Football in Kolkata
Football clubs in Kolkata
Sports clubs in India
Multi-sport clubs in India